Bangladesh National Film Award for Best Music Direction is the highest award for music direction in Bangladeshi film.

History
Ferdausi Rahman became the only female musician to claim a National Award for best music direction. Alauddin Ali three consecutive awards in the years : 1978, 1979 and 1980. Khandaker Nurul Alam won this award in 1984, 1986 and 1991. Satya Saha earned two consecutive awards in 1994 and 1996. Alam Khan earned three awards in the 1980s : 1982, 1985 and 1987. On the other hand, Alauddin Ali won his 4th and 5th (the last) National Award in 1988 and 1990 respectively. Azad Rahman earned this honour twice : 1977 and 1993. Alam Khan surpassed Alauddin Ali's record in 2009 by winning a record 6th National Film Award.

Records and facts
 Alam Khan is the most awarded music director with 5 wins. Alauddin Ali is a step behind with 5 awards. Emon Saha and Shujeo Shyam have received 4 times each. Khandaker Nurul Alam has received 3 times. Satya Saha, Ahmed Imtiaz Bulbul and Azad Rahman has two awards.
 Alauddin Ali is the only music director to win this award in three consecutive awards. Other three composers who have defended awards are Satya Saha in 1994 and 1996 (no award was given in 1995), Sujay Sham in 2002 and 2004 (no award in 2004) and Emon Saha in 2011 and 2012.

List of winners
Key

See also
 Bangladesh National Film Award for Best Music Composer
 Bangladesh National Film Award for Best Lyrics
 Bangladesh National Film Award for Best Male Playback Singer
 Bangladesh National Film Award for Best Female Playback Singer

Notes

References

Sources

 
 
 
 
 
 

Music
National Film Awards (Bangladesh)
Bangladeshi music awards